Macaranga conglomerata is a species of plant in the family Euphorbiaceae. It is found in Kenya and Tanzania. It is threatened by habitat loss.

References

conglomerata
Vulnerable plants
Taxonomy articles created by Polbot